The Department of the Air Force Athlete of the Year is a yearly award for the best male and female athlete of the United States Air Force and United States Space Force. Many winners were part of the United States Air Force World Class Athlete Program. Until 2021 it was named United States Air Force Athlete of the Year.

Men

Women

References